The Ministry of Foreign Affairs (MoFA) is responsible for conducting external affairs of the Federal Democratic Republic of Nepal. Ministry of Foreign Affairs represents other line ministries and the Government of Nepal while dealing with other states.

History
Nepal's modern, bilateral diplomatic relations officially began with neighboring India in June 1947, followed by formal relations with France in April 1949.

Roles, responsibility, and function 
According to Government of Nepal (Allocation of Business) Rules, 2069 (2012) Ministry of Foreign Affairs has the following roles, responsibility, and function:
 Formulation, implementation, monitoring and evaluation of foreign policy, plan and programs of Nepal
 Relation with foreign nations
 Representation of Nepal in foreign countries
 Publicity of Nepal in foreign countries
 Passport and visa to be issued in abroad
 Hospitality Management
 Protocol
 Claim over a person of a Nepali or foreign citizen by the respective governments.
 Diplomatic protection (immunities) and privileges
 Record of Nepali citizens who are in abroad and their right, interest and protection.
 Non-resident Nepalese
 Economic diplomacy
 Development and promotion of public and non-governmental organizations at international level
 Consular practice
 United Nations, South Asian Association of Regional Cooperation and other international and regional organization
 Foreign diplomatic mission in Nepal
 Negotiation and agreement at diplomatic level (on the matters which do not fall under any other ministry)
 Operation of Nepal foreign service

List of ministers

Organisational structure 
There are two departments under the Ministry of Foreign Affairs:
 Department of Passport, Narayanhiti, Kathmandu
 Department of Consular Services, Tripureshwor, Kathmandu

The Ministry has operated a Liaison Office in the border town of Birgunj since 2005.

The Ministry operates the Institute of Foreign Affairs (IFA) in Tripureshwor, Kathmandu.

See also
 Foreign relations of Nepal
 List of diplomatic missions of Nepal
 List of diplomatic missions in Nepal

References

External links
 Official Ministry website

Foreign affairs
Foreign relations of Nepal
Nepal